Gyronotus perissinottoi is a species of scarab beetle. The species was found in South Africa, and formally described in 2013. According to Sci-News, "Gyronotus beetles are regarded among the most endangered of the African scarab beetles because of their sensitivity to disturbance".

References

Scarabaeidae
Beetles of Africa
Insects of South Africa
Beetles described in 2013